Sir Walter Gibson Pringle Cassels (14 August 1845 – 1 March 1923) was a Canadian lawyer and judge. He was the first President of the Exchequer Court of Canada from 1920 until his death in 1923.

Biography 
Cassels was born in Quebec City, the son of the banker and businessman Robert Cassels. He was educated at Quebec High School and the University of Toronto, graduating with a BA in 1865. He was called to the Bar in Ontario in 1869, and practiced at Blake, Lash, Cassels. He became a Queen's Counsel in 1883.

Cassels was appointed a judge of the Exchequer Court of Canada in 1908 (his brother Robert, as Registrar of the Supreme Court of Canada from 1875 to 1898, had been the Exchequer Court's first registrar). He was knighted in 1917. In 1920, he became the Court's first President when the position was established. As a judge of the Exchequer Court, he was on occasion to sit as an ad hoc judge in the Supreme Court of Canada, which he did thirty-three times from 1918 to 1922. He died in Ottawa in 1923.

Cassels Lake in Temagami, Ontario is named in his honour.

References 

 Ian Bushnell, The Federal Court of Canada: A History, 1875-1992. Toronto: University of Toronto Press, 1997.

1845 births
1923 deaths
People from Quebec City
University of Toronto alumni
Canadian King's Counsel
Judges of the Exchequer Court of Canada
Canadian Knights Bachelor